The Ruins of Talamanca (Spanish: Ruinas de Talamanca) are an archaeological site located in Talamanca de Jarama, Spain. It was declared Bien de Interés Cultural in 1931.

References 

Archaeological sites in Spain
Buildings and structures in the Community of Madrid
Bien de Interés Cultural landmarks in the Community of Madrid
Talamanca de Jarama